Timothy Liu (born 1965 in San Jose, California) is an American poet and the author of such books as Bending the Mind Around the Dream's Blown Fuse, For Dust Thou Art, Of Thee I Sing, Hard Evidence, Say Goodnight, Burnt Offerings and Vox Angelica. He is also the editor of Word of Mouth: An Anthology of Gay American Poetry.

Liu received his B.A. in English (1989) from Brigham Young University and his M.A. in Poetry (1991) from the University of Houston; he also studied at the University of California, Los Angeles and the University of Massachusetts, Amherst where he met his husband, the artist Christopher Arabadjis. Liu was a Professor of English at William Paterson University until he took early retirement in January 2022. He currently teaches at SUNY New Paltz and Vassar College. He has also taught at Hampshire College, Cornell College, University of California Berkeley, University of North Carolina Wilmington, University of Michigan, Tulane University, and in the Graduate Writing Seminars at Bennington College. His journals and papers are archived in the Berg Collection at the New York Public Library.

Works 
 Vox Angelica (Alice James Books, 1992; Norma Farber First Book Award from the Poetry Society of America)
 Burnt Offerings (Copper Canyon Press, 1995)
 Say Goodnight (Copper Canyon Press, 1998; PEN/Beyond Margins Award)
 Hard Evidence (Talisman House, 2001)
 Of Thee I Sing (University of Georgia Press, 2004; Poetry Book-of-the-Year Award from Publishers Weekly)
 For Dust Thou Art (Southern Illinois University Press, 2005)
 Bending the Mind Around the Dream's Blown Fuse (Talisman House, 2009)
 Polytheogamy (Saturnalia Books, 2009)
 Don't Go Back To Sleep (Saturnalia Books, 2014)
 Kingdom Come: A Fantasia (Talisman House, 2017)
 Luminous Debris: New & Selected Legerdemain 1992-2017 (Barrow Street Books, 2018)
 Let It Ride (Saturnalia Books, 2019)

As editor
 Word of Mouth: An Anthology of Gay American Poetry (Talisman House, 2000)

Included in
 Harvest: Contemporary Mormon Poems (Signature, 1989)
 2002 Best American Poetry (Scribners, 2002)
 2011 Pushcart Prize (Pushcart, 2011)
 Fire in the Pasture: 21st Century Mormon Poets (Peculiar Pages, 2011)

References

External links 
Timothy Liu's Website
Timothy Liu's Author Page at the Academy of American Poets
An interview with Timothy Liu
A review of two books by Timothy Liu
A review of Of Thee I Sing
Audio: Timothy Liu on Live from Prairie Lights, October 2004
Audio: Timothy Liu on Penn Sound (Race and Poetry: Integrating the Experimental)
Audio: Timothy Liu on Drunken Boat

American male poets
Living people
American gay writers
University of Houston alumni
American LGBT poets
University of Michigan faculty
1965 births
21st-century American poets
21st-century American male writers
Gay poets